Tianjin Huochetou Stadium (Simplified Chinese: 天津火车头体育场) is a multi-use stadium in Tianjin, China. Currently used mostly for football matches, its capacity is 12,000 people.

References

Football venues in Tianjin
Sports venues in Tianjin